Tin Animal Money is a form of currency believed to be used by the royal courts of Malay Peninsula from the 15th through 18th centuries. It evolved into a form of currency used in Perak, Selangor and Negeri Sembilan. The most common shape was that of a crocodile. Other forms include tortoises, elephants, fish, crickets, beetles, chickens and other birds and animals such as goat sheep cow etc. animal money was used as a means of exchange

See also

 Malaysian ringgit
 Ringgit
 Sultanate of Malacca
 Tin ingot

External links
 Classification of Ingot Money Forms of Malay Peninsula, Kra Isthmus and Menam Valley

History of Perak
History of Selangor
History of Negeri Sembilan
Obsolete currencies in Malaysian history